Ad hoc Wireless Distribution Service (AWDS) is a layer 2 routing protocol to connect mobile ad hoc networks, sometimes called wireless mesh networks.  It is based on a link-state routing protocol, similar to OLSR.

Principle of operation
AWDS uses a link-state routing protocol for organizing the network. In contrast to other implementations like OLSR it operates in layer 2. That means no IP addresses must be assigned because the unique MAC addresses of the WLAN hardware is used instead. Furthermore, all kinds of layer 3 protocols can be used, like IP, DHCP, IPv6, IPX, etc. The protocol daemon creates a virtual network interface, which can be used by the kernel like a typical LAN interface.

Alternatives
The list of ad hoc routing protocols contains a large set of alternatives. However, most of them 
are academic and do not exist as practical implementations.

References

External links
 An implementation for Linux is available at https://web.archive.org/web/20070504155750/http://awds.berlios.de/
 Analysis of Mesh Architectures Why all mesh technologies are not created equal.
 What is Third Generation Mesh? Review of three generation of mesh networking architectures.
Is Multi-radio mesh worthwhile? Cost and performance considerations of multi-radio mesh.

Wireless networking
Ad hoc routing protocols